Mary Lacy (c. 1740 – 1801) was a British sailor, shipwright and memoirist. She was arguably the first woman to have been given an exam and a pension from the British Admiralty as a shipwright.

Early life 
Lacy was born in Wickham, Kent in 1740. She became a domestic servant, aged twelve. In 1759, aged nineteen, Lacy ran away from home dressed as a boy. Using the name William Chandler, Lacy worked as a servant for a ship's carpenter of the British navy. William was her father's name and Chandler was her mother's maiden name. She then studied as an apprentice to be a shipwright in 1763, going on to successfully complete the apprenticeship. In 1770, she took her exam as a shipwright, arguably the first woman to have done so. In 1771, however, she was forced to stop working because of her rheumatism, and applied for a pension from the Admiralty under her legal name, Mary Lacy, which was granted. She published her memoirs The Female Shipwright in 1773. This was reprinted by the National Maritime Museum in 2008.

Later life 
On 25 October 1772, at St Mary Abbots, Kensington, Mary Lacy married Josias Slade, a shipwright, of Deptford, Kent. That same year, Mary gave birth to her first child, Margaret Lacey Slade, who was baptized at St Nicholas, Deptford, Kent, on 29 August. Their other children were Josias Slade (1775–1777), Mary Slade (1777–1777), Josias Slade (1778–1781), Elizabeth Slade (1780–1780), and John Slade (born 1784).

In 1775 Mary petitioned for her husband to be granted a servant because of his 16 years' service as a shipwright. She had also applied unsuccessfully before Lord Sandwich for her husband to succeed Thomas Boyles, who lined the stuff for the Sawyers at the dockyard.

Mary died in 1801 and was buried at St Paul's, Deptford, Kent, on 3 May 1801. Her husband, Josias Slade, died in 1814 and was also buried at St Paul, Deptford, Kent, on 13 February 1814. In his will and codicil, he only mentions his son, John Slade, and daughter, Margaret, now wife of Joseph Ward (Margaret Lacey Ward died the following year and was buried at St Paul, Deptford, Kent, on 23 April 1815).

A chapter in Suzanne Stark's book Female Tars: Women Aboard Ship in the Age of Sail features Lacy's life in eighteenth century England.

Published works

References

 The Lady Tars: The Autobiographies of Hannah Snell, Mary Lacy and Mary Anne Talbot

1740 births
1801 deaths
British shipwrights
British memoirists
British women memoirists
Women carpenters
18th-century English women writers
Female sailors